Clithon retropictum() is a species of freshwater and brackish water snail with an operculum, a nerite. It is an aquatic gastropod mollusk in the family Neritidae, the nerites.

Distribution 
This species occurs in Japan: Honshu, Kyushu and Shikoku.Its habitat is also located in South Korea near Jeju.

Description

Habitat 
This nerite lives in brackish water as well as freshwater.

Feeding habits
Clithon retropictum is herbivorous species.

Life cycle 
Clithon retropictum is oviparous. Juveniles hatch from eggs in September. The lifespan of Clithon retropictum is up to 12 years and it belongs among the most long-lived of freshwater gastropods.

Parasites 
 Vibrio parahaemolyticus

Status
The species is considered as a second grade endangered species by the Korean ministry of environment.

References

Further reading 
 HIRATA TETSU, UEDA HAJIME, TSUCHIYA YASUTAKA, SATO TOSHIHIKO & NISHIWAKI SABURO. 1999. Distribution of Clithon retropictus(Gastropoda; Neritidae) and environmental conditions in the rivers of Izu Peninsula. Bulletin of the Faculty of Education & Human Sciences, Yamanashi University, Volume 1, number 1, 24-30. (article in Japanese, English abstract)

External links 

 https://web.archive.org/web/20070909103814/http://shell.kwansei.ac.jp/~shell/pic_book/data08/r000792.html photos of shells
 https://web.archive.org/web/20080907101015/http://www.gastropods.com/8/Shell_8638.html photos of shells

Neritidae
Gastropods described in 1879
Endangered species